The 1977 Coppa Italia Final was the final of the 1976–77 Coppa Italia. The match was played on 3 July 1977 between Milan and Internazionale. Milan won 2–0. It was Milan's eighth final and fourth victory.

Match

References 
Coppa Italia 1976/77 statistics at rsssf.com
 https://www.worldfootball.net/schedule/ita-coppa-italia-1976-1977-finale/2/

Coppa Italia Finals
Coppa Italia Final 1977
Coppa Italia Final 1977